Pearl Harbor is a lagoon harbor on the island of Oahu, Hawaii, west of Honolulu.
Joint Base Pearl Harbor–Hickam, the joint United States Navy and Air Force base in Oahu 
 Attack on Pearl Harbor, the 7 December 1941 Japanese attack on the American naval base
 Pearl Harbor National Wildlife Refuge

Pearl Harbor may also refer to:
 Tora! Tora! Tora!, 1970 film about the 7 December 1941 Japanese attack on Pearl Harbor
 Pearl Harbor (film), a 2001 film based on the 7 December 1941 Japanese attack
 Pearl Harbor and the Explosions, a new-wave band formed in 1978
 Pearl Harbor: A Novel of December 8th, a book by Newt Gingrich and William R. Forstchen
 "Pearl Harbor" (Malcolm in the Middle), a season six episode of the television series Malcolm in the Middle
 , a US Navy amphibious assault ship

See also
 Pearl Harbour, New Zealand